Peter Egboche Ogaba (24 September 1974 – 5 August 2016) was a Nigerian footballer who was last known to have played as a defender for Holstebro.

Career

Club career

Ogaba started his career with Belgian top flight side Lokeren, where he suffered a knee ligament injury and made 11 league appearances and scored 0 goals. On 23 May 1992, Ogaba debuted for Lokeren during a 1-1 draw with Charleroi. In 1993, he signed for FC Oulu in the Finnish second division. In July 1993 he signed for German Bundesliga club MSV Duisburg. After that, Ogaba signed for Beja in the Portuguese second division. In 1998, he signed for Icelandic team Leiftur. after that, he signed for Holstebro in Denmark.

International career

Ogaba represented Nigeria at the 1987 FIFA U-16 World Championship and the 1989 FIFA World Youth Championship, where he was the youngest player, aged 14.

References

1974 births
2016 deaths
Nigerian footballers
Nigeria youth international footballers
Association football defenders
Nigerian expatriate footballers
Expatriate footballers in Belgium
Expatriate footballers in Finland
Expatriate footballers in Germany
Expatriate footballers in Portugal
Expatriate footballers in Iceland
Expatriate men's footballers in Denmark
K.S.C. Lokeren Oost-Vlaanderen players

MSV Duisburg players
C.D. Beja players
Knattspyrnufélag Fjallabyggðar players
Bundesliga players
Belgian Pro League players
Nigerian expatriate sportspeople in Belgium
Nigerian expatriate sportspeople in Finland
Nigerian expatriate sportspeople in Germany
Nigerian expatriate sportspeople in Portugal
Nigerian expatriate sportspeople in Iceland
Nigerian expatriate sportspeople in Denmark